Racing Club de Bafoussam is a Cameroonian football club based in Bafoussam. They are a member of the Cameroonian Football Federation. Their home stadium is Stade Municipal de Bamendzi, a multi-use stadium in Bafoussam. The stadium holds 5,000 people. They are most famous for developing Geremi Njitap.

The club was relegated from the MTN Elite one in 2006.

Honours
 Elite 1: 4
 1989, 1992, 1993, 1995.
Elite 2: 1
2020-21
 Cameroon Cup: 1
 1996.
Runners-up: 1976, 1988, 1991.

Super Coupe Roger Milla: 0

Performance in CAF competitions
CAF Champions League: 5 appearances
2005 - First Round
1990: Quarter-Finals
1993: Second Round
1994: Second Round
1995: withdrew in First Round

African Cup Winners' Cup: 1 appearance
1997 - disqualified in First Round

References

External links
Team profile - Soccerway.com

Football clubs in Cameroon
Association football clubs established in 1950
1950 establishments in French Cameroon
West Region (Cameroon)
Football venues in Cameroon